New Kenda is a census town in the Jamuria CD block in the Asansol Sadar subdivision in the Paschim Bardhaman district in the Indian state of West Bengal.

Geography

Healthcare
Medical facilities in the Kenda Area of ECL are available at Chhora Regional Hospital (with 30 beds) (PO Bahula), New Kenda (PO New Kenda), Lower Kenda (PO Haripur), Bahula (PO Bahula),  CL Jambad (PO Bahula), Siduli (PO Siduli), Haripur (PO Haripur), CBI (PO Haripur), Chora Group pits (PO Haripur) ).

References 

Cities and towns in Paschim Bardhaman district